Neal-Schuman Publishers, Inc. is an imprint of the American Library Association. Its headquarters are in Chicago. The imprint publishes professional books intended for archivists, knowledge managers, and librarians.

History
Patricia Glass Schuman and John Vincent Neal founded the publisher in 1976. Originally the company packaged library reference books and professional books published by other companies. Beginning in 1979, Neal-Schuman began marketing and publishing its own books.

In 2011 Neal-Schuman had a headquarters in New York City and an office in London. It had over 500 in-print backlist titles. It also marketed and/or copublished around 200 books and monographs. During that year ALA Publishing acquired Neal-Schuman, with the takeover effective on December 23, 2011. In the following three months, ALA planned to move Neal-Schuman operations from New York City to Chicago.

References

External links

 
 Neal-Schuman Publishers to join ALA Publishing, American Library Association. December 20, 2011.

Publishing companies of the United States
Publishing companies established in 1976
1976 establishments in Illinois